St Mirren competed in the Scottish Premier League, after finishing in tenth place in 2007–08. The 2008–09 season also saw the club leave Love Street for the new St Mirren Park in Greenhill Road.

Transfers

In

Out

Results

Scottish Premier League

Scottish Cup

League Cup

Friendlies

Competitions

Overall

SPL

Classification

Results summary

Results by round

See also
List of St Mirren F.C. seasons

References

2008–09
Saint Mirren